AB7 is a Swedish passenger car of the 1980s-cars featuring both first and second class seating.
In 2008 SJ decided to refurbish and modify some of their carriages originally built in the 1980s. As a part of the modernization program in 2009-2010, SJ rebuilt all of their AB9 carriages to a more modern version, designated the AB7. The main difference is that the smoking section of the carriages were removed. The carriages feature an open saloon as the seating area, as well as 230 V power outlets and 4 restrooms in each carriage with 2 in each end.

References

External links 
 Järnväg.net - Personvagn AB7

Rolling stock of Sweden
Passenger railroad cars